Marcel Fortuna (born October 22, 1985) is a Brazilian mixed martial artist currently competing in the Middleweight division of Titan FC. A professional mixed martial artist since 2011, Fortuna has previously competed in the Ultimate Fighting Championship.

Background
Born and raised in Brazil, Fortuna began training in Brazilian Jiu-Jitsu at the age of 16, and went on to have an accomplished career in the sport. As a brown belt, Fortuna was a world champion, and won the South American, European, and Pan-American championships as a black belt. He moved to the United States in 2009, settling in Northern California.

Mixed martial arts career

Ultimate Fighting Championship
Fortuna was later signed by the UFC and made his debut at UFC Fight Night: Bermudez vs. The Korean Zombie in a Heavyweight bout against Anthony Hamilton. Despite being undersized, Fortuna won via knockout with an overhand right in the first round. This fight earned him the  Performance of the Night award.

Fortuna faced Jordan Johnson on July 7, 2017 at The Ultimate Fighter 25 Finale. He lost the fight by unanimous decision.

Fortuna faced Jake Collier on November 11, 2017 at UFC Fight Night: Poirier vs. Pettis. He lost the fight by unanimous decision.

On August 14, 2018, it was announced that Fortuna was released from UFC.

Post-UFC career
After splitting camps between his native Brazil and various gyms in California, Fortuna decided to move to Florida in order to train solely at Sanford MMA (formerly known as Hard Knocks 365). Fortuna faced Andreas Michailidis at Titan FC 54 on April 26, 2019. He lost the bout via spinning back kick in the first round.

Championships and accomplishments

Mixed martial arts
Ultimate Fighting Championship
Performance of the Night (One time)

Dragon House
Dragon House Light Heavyweight Championship (Two successful title defenses)

Mixed martial arts record

|-
|Win
|align=center|10–4
|Tim Caron
|Decision (unanimous)
|PFC: Premier FC 31
|
|align=center|3
|align=center|5:00
|Springfield, Massachusetts, United States
|
|-
|Loss
|align=center|9–4
|Andreas Michailidis
|TKO (spinning wheel kick and punches)
|Titan FC 54
|
|align=center|1
|align=center|4:26
|Fort Lauderdale, Florida, United States
|
|-
|Loss
|align=center|9–3
|Jake Collier
|Decision (unanimous)
|UFC Fight Night: Poirier vs. Pettis
|
|align=center|3
|align=center|5:00
|Norfolk, Virginia, United States
|
|-
|Loss
|align=center|9–2
|Jordan Johnson
|Decision (unanimous)
|The Ultimate Fighter: Redemption Finale
|
|align=center|3
|align=center|5:00
|Las Vegas, Nevada, United States
|
|-
|Win
|align=center|9–1
|Anthony Hamilton
|KO (punch)
|UFC Fight Night: Bermudez vs. The Korean Zombie
|
|align=center|1
|align=center|3:10
|Houston, Texas, United States
|
|-
|Win
|align=center|8–1
|David Mitchell
|Decision (unanimous)
|Dragon House 20
|
|align=center|3
|align=center|5:00
|Oakland, California, United States
|
|-
|Win
|align=center|7–1
|Jordan Powell
|Submission (side choke)
|Dragon House 19
|
|align=center|1
|align=center|0:18
|Oakland, California, United States
|
|-
|Win
|align=center|6–1
|Mike Ortega
|Submission (rear-naked choke)
|Dragon House 17
|
|align=center|3
|align=center|1:17
|Oakland, California, United States
|
|-
|Win
|align=center|5–1
|Manny Murillo
|Decision (unanimous)
|Dragon House 16
|
|align=center|3
|align=center|5:00
|Oakland, California, United States
|
|-
|Win
|align=center|4–1
|CJ Marsh
|Submission (baseball choke)
|War MMA 1: Roberts vs. Baesman
|
|align=center|2
|align=center|2:40
|Stockton, California, United States
|
|-
|Loss
|align=center|3–1
|Jesse Taylor
|Decision (unanimous)
|Dragon House 11
|
|align=center|3
|align=center|5:00
|Oakland, California, United States
|
|-
|Win
|align=center|3–0
|Sean Pierre
|Decision (unanimous)
|Impact MMA: Recognition
|
|align=center|3
|align=center|5:00
|Pleasanton, California, United States
|
|-
|Win
|align=center|2–0
|Ryan Williams
|Submission (rear-naked choke)
|Capitol Fighting Championships: Fall Classic
|
|align=center|1
|align=center|2:05
|Sacramento, California, United States
|
|-
|Win
|align=center|1–0
|David Villescaz
|Submission (armbar)
|Rebel Fights
|
|align=center|1
|align=center|2:23
|Plymouth, California, United States
|

See also
 List of current UFC fighters
 List of male mixed martial artists

References

External links
 
 

Living people
Brazilian expatriates in the United States
Brazilian male mixed martial artists
Mixed martial artists utilizing Brazilian jiu-jitsu
1985 births
Ultimate Fighting Championship male fighters
Brazilian practitioners of Brazilian jiu-jitsu
People awarded a black belt in Brazilian jiu-jitsu